Auguste (or Augusta) was a privateer launched at Bordeaux in 1808. She made three cruises. For her first cruise she was under the command of a Captain Henry, with 70 men and eighteen 8-pounder guns. For her second cruise she was under a Captain La Case. Her third and last cruise took place from December 1810 until her capture on 6 April 1811. She was under the command of Juan Jamays, with 11 officers and 115 men.

Capture:  captured Auguste on 6 April 1811, and brought her into Cork.

Citations and references
Citations

References
 

1808 ships
Ships built in France
Privateer ships of France
Captured ships